Vezneciler is a station on the M2 line of the Istanbul Metro. The station is located under Şehzadebaşı Street and 16 Mart Şehitleri Street in the historical Fatih district of Istanbul. Opened on 16 March 2014, Vezneciler is the most recently opened station on the M2 line. During the inauguration the station was dedicated to Ottoman police officers who were killed during a conflict with British forces during the Occupation of Constantinople in 1920. Istanbul University's main campus, Beyazıt Square and the Şehzade Mosque are a few landmarks in the vicinity of the station. On 7 June 2016, a bomb reportedly targeting a police bus struck around this station.

Layout

References

Railway stations opened in 2014
Istanbul metro stations
Fatih
2014 establishments in Turkey